The Sumathi Best Teledrama Supporting Actress Award is presented annually in Sri Lanka by the Sumathi Group of Companies for the best Sri Lankan supporting television actress for that year.

The award was first given in 1995. The following is a list of the winners of this award since 1995.

References

Supportin Actor
Television awards for Best Supporting Actress